Charles Cleveland may refer to:

 Charles Cleveland (basketball) (1951–2012), American college basketball player
 Charles F. Cleveland (1845–1908), American soldier and Medal of Honor recipient
 Charles G. Cleveland (1927–2021), U.S. Air Force general and flying ace
 Charles H. Cleveland, United States Army major general
 Charles T. Cleveland (born 1958), U.S. Army general